The Overbrook Brothers is a 2009 comedy film directed by John E. Bryant. Co-written by Bryant and longtime friend Jason Foxworth, the film received its world premiere in the Narrative Competition at the SXSW Film Festival in 2009. Principal photography took place in the spring of 2008 for 3 weeks in various locations in Northern Colorado including Ft. Collins, and Idaho Springs. The remaining three weeks of principal photography took place in Austin, Texas, and surrounding towns.

References

http://sxsw.com/film/screenings/schedule/?a=show&s=F14614#
http://www.indiewire.com/article/2009/03/09/sxsw_interview_the_overbrook_brothers_director_john_bryant/
http://www.dfw.com/183/story/105533.html
http://efilmcritic.com/feature.php?feature=2718
http://www.ifc.com/news/2009/03/graphic-the-2009-sxsw-film-fam.php
http://www.screendaily.com/ScreenDailyArticle.aspx?intStoryID=43514&Category=523

External links
IMDB entry
Official movie site

2009 films
2009 comedy films
American comedy films
2000s English-language films
2000s American films